Sligo University Hospital is an acute general hospital in Sligo, Ireland. It is managed by Saolta University Health Care Group.

History
The hospital has its origins in the Sligo County Hospital which was built in the Mall in Sligo and opened in 1940. A major extension to the hospital was officially opened by Erskine Childers, Tánaiste in March 1971. The hospital changed its name from Sligo General Hospital to Sligo University Hospital in November 2015.

References

External links
Official Website
Emergency Department, SRH
Research and Education Centre Library

Sligo (town)
Health Service Executive hospitals
1940 establishments in Ireland
Hospitals established in 1940
Hospital buildings completed in 1940
Hospitals in County Sligo